Kevin McCarthy is the speaker of the United States House of Representatives since 2023.

Kevin McCarthy may also refer to:

Politicians
Kevin McCarthy (Iowa politician) (born 1971), Democratic member of the Iowa House of Representatives
Kevin A. McCarthy (born 1950), Democratic member of the Illinois House of Representatives

Others
Kevin McCarthy (actor) (1914–2010), film actor
Kevin McCarthy (baseball) (born 1992), baseball player
Kevin McCarthy (cricketer) (born 1945), Australian cricketer
Kevin McCarthy (director), American television director
Kevin McCarthy (historian), American historian
Kevin McCarthy (ice hockey) (born 1957), Canadian ice hockey player and assistant coach
Kevin McCarthy (radio), Texas radio personality
Kevin "Blondie" McCarthy, member of the Aryan Republican Army, who robbed 22 U.S. banks

See also
Kevin MacArthur, fictional character on television series The League
Kevin McCarty (born 1972), Democratic member of the California State Assembly
McCarthy (surname)